David Angelo Diach Madrigal (born 7 June 1974) is a Costa Rican professional footballer who currently plays for Guatemalan side Halcones.

Club career
Diach made his debut on 5 August 1995 for Costa Rican Second Division Vecinos and has played for several clubs in Costa Rica. He had spells with Trikala and Paniliakos in the Greek Super League during the 1999-00 season, played in the second divisions in Brazil and China and for Brujas and Cartaginés whom he joined in January 2005.

He also had a brief spell with vision del 10 Luis Ángel Firpo in El Salvador where he scored 14 goals and with Antigua GFC in Guatemala.

He returned to Costa Rica, to play for Herediano until he joined Carmelita in June 2007. He joined América de Chimaltenango in Guatemala for the 2009–2010 season, but he returned to Costa Rica to play for Limón in January 2010.

In August 2013 he returned to Barrio Mexico after scoring 20 goals for fellow second division outfit Juventud Escazuceña in the 2012/13 season.
In January 2014 Diach returned to Guatemala to play for Halcones.

International career
Diach has made six appearances for the Costa Rica national football team, his debut coming in a qualifying match for the 1998 FIFA World Cup against Canada on November 16, 1997 which proved to be his sole FIFA competition match.

His final international was an October 2007 friendly match against Haiti.

References

External links
 
 “Hay futbolistas buenos y malos, no viejos y jóvenes” David Diach, goleador de Barrio México (50 Questions) - Diario Extra 
 Profile at Nacion 

1974 births
Living people
Association football forwards
Costa Rican men's footballers
Costa Rica international footballers
L.D. Alajuelense footballers
Trikala F.C. players
Paniliakos F.C. players
Roma Esporte Apucarana players
Ceará Sporting Club players
C.S. Herediano footballers
Nanjing Yoyo players
Brujas FC players
C.S. Cartaginés players
C.D. Luis Ángel Firpo footballers
Liga FPD players
A.D. Carmelita footballers
Costa Rican expatriate footballers
Expatriate footballers in Greece
Expatriate footballers in Brazil
Expatriate footballers in China
Expatriate footballers in El Salvador
Expatriate footballers in Guatemala
Costa Rican expatriate sportspeople in Greece
Costa Rican expatriate sportspeople in Brazil
Costa Rican expatriate sportspeople in El Salvador
Costa Rican expatriate sportspeople in Guatemala
Antigua GFC players